Kataharamachi Station may refer to:
 Kataharamachi Station (Kagawa) on the Kotoden Kotohira Line
 Kataharamachi Station (Toyama) on the Man'yōsen Takaoka Kidō Line